This is a glossary of acronyms and initials used for avionics and aircraft instruments in the Russian Federation and formerly the USSR. The Latin-alphabet names are phonetic representations of the Cyrillic originals, and variations are inevitable.



Avionics and instruments

 - navigation display/drift sight

 - integrated automatic control system

 - chronometer

 - artificial horizons and situation display

 Avia-gorizont Istrebitel'nyy  – artificial horizon for fighter aircraft

 - artificial horizon0

 - optical bombsight

 - astro-inertial navigation system

1. - directional Gyro
2. - autopilots pre1960

 - secure digital data-links

 - magnetic anomaly detectors MAD

 - automatic control systems for dispensers ('chuff and fluff' - Chaff and Flare countermeasures)

 Avtomaht Pereklahdki Stabilizahtora – automatic stabiliser incidence adjuster

 Automatcheskiy RadioKompass - automatic radio compass ADF

 - analogue FM secure data-links and beacon rx

 - analogue FM secure data-links and beacon rx

 Avtomat Regulirovaniya Usily – artificial feel device

 Avtomat Regulirovaniya Zagruzki - artificial feel system

 Avtomaticheskiy Navigatsionnyy Pribor – automatic navigation device

 Avtomaht Passivnykh Pomekh – automatic passive ECM/IRCM device

1. Aviacionny Strelkovy Pritsel – aerial gun-sight
2. Avtomaticheskiy Strelkovyy Pritsel – computing gun-sight

 - airborne automatic thermo-anemometer

 - GCI receivers

 Avtomaht Oosiliy – automatic artificial feel unit

 Avtomaht Ooglov Atahki, Snosa i Peregroozki – automatic AOA/sideslip/g limiter

 - chronometer0

 Bortovaya Avtomaticheskaya Registreeruyushchaya Sistema – on-board automatic recording system

 - integrated defence electronics complex

 Blok Krenovykh Popravok – bank compensation module

 - weather research RADAR

 - telemetry receiver

 Bortovoy Tsifrovoy Kompleks – on-board digital suite

 Blok Oopravleniya - control module

 - Dutch roll damper

 - combined VSI & turn and bank indicator

 Distantsionnyy AstroKompass – DAB – remote celestial compass

 Distantsionnyy Gheeromagnitnyy Kompass – gyro-magnetic compass

 - flux-gate compass

 Doplerovskiy Izmeritel' Skorosti i Snosa - doppler speed/drift sensor system

 - secure data link

 - pitch damper

 Elektricheskiy Distantsionnyy Gheeromagnitnyy Kompass – electro-gyro-magnetic compass

 Elektronnaya Sistema Upravleniya Vozduhozabornika – inlet ramp control system

 Elektrischeskiy Ooskazahtel' Povorota – electric turn and bank indicator

 (suffix) Grazahnskiy - civil

 GheeroIndooktsionnyy Kompass - earth inductor/gyro flux compass

 GLObahl'naya NAvigatsionnaya Spootnikovaya Sistema – global navigation satellite system

 - compass system

 - directional gyro

 GheeroPoluKompas - gyro-compass

 - exhaust gas temperature indicator

 Izmeritel'nyy Kompleks Vysokovo Razresheniya – high resolution measurement system

 Izmeritel'nyy Kompleks Vysokovo Razresheniya – high resolution measurement system

 - advanced HUD no relation to ILS

 Izmeritel'-Registrahtor Impool'snykh Signahlov – [electro-magnetic] pulse signal measurement and recording device

 - inertial navigation system

 - tachometer

 Indikahtor Vertikahl'nykh Rezheemov – vertical modes indicator

 Kompleks [Vo'orouzheniya] – weapons system

 Korrekteeruyemaya Avia P - autopilot roll only

 - compass

 Kompleks Navigahtsii/Navigatsionnyy – navigation system

 Kol'tsevoy Pritsel - ring sight

 Kompleks Polunatoornovo Modeleerovaniya – testrig/combat simulator

 Komanhdnoye Rahdio'upravleniye - radio command guidance system

 Komanhdnoye Rahdio'upravleniye Oopravlyayemoy Bomboy - radio command guidance system for UB guided bombs

 Koorsovaya Sistema – compass system

 Koorsavaya Sistema Istrebiel'naya – course indicator system for fighters

 Kombineerovanny oozkazahtel' Skorosti – airspeed indicator

 - Mach meter

 MnogoFoonktsionahl'nyy Blok Oopravleniya – multi-function missile control module

 Markernyy RahdioPreeyomnik - marker beacon receiver

 Navigatsionnyy Bombardirovchnyy Avtomaht – automatic navigation/bomb release module

 Navigatsionnyy Indikahtor - ground position indicator

 Navigatsionnyy Kompleks – navigation suite

 Nochnoy Kollimahtonyy Pritsel Bombardirovochnyy – night capable collimator bombsight

 Navigatsionnoye Vychislitel'noye Oostroystvo - navigation computer

 Optika-Elektronnoya Pritselnaya Sistema – electro-optical search and track system

 Optika-Elektronnoya Pritsel'no-navigatsionnyy Kompleks – electro-optical weapons aiming and navigation system

 Optiko-Lokatsionnaya Stahntsiya – Modernizeerovannaya – combined IR/TV search and track/laser ranger unit

 Opticheskiy Pritsel - optical gunsight

 Opticheskiy Pritsel bombardirovochnyy – optical synchronised bombsight

 Oboroodovaniye Slepoy Posahdki - instrument/blind landing system

 (suffix) Pomekhozashchishchonnost – ECM resistant

 Poluaktivnaya Rahdiolokatsionnaya Golovka [samonavedeniya] – semi-active radar seeker head

 Pritsel Dlya Bombometahniya s Kabreerovaniya – bomb sight for nbomb delivery in a climb [toss/loft bombing sight]

 Parashootno-desahntnaya Sistema Pelengahtsii – parachute dropping system receiver

 Proyektsionnyy Indikahtor Navigatsionnoy Obstanovki – navigation head up display

 Pritsel KI - collimator sight

 Pritsel'no-navigatsionnaya Sistema - nav attack system

 Pritsel P – high altitude sight

 Poluaktivnaya Rahdiolokatsionnaya Golovka Samonavedeniya – semi-active radar seeker

 Pritsel'no-Navigatsionnyy Kompleks – nav/attack system

 Pritsel Rahdiolokatsionnyy Strelkoyy - gunners RADAR sight

 Pritsel'naya stahntsiya – sighting station

 Pribor Slepovo Bomometahniya I Navigahtsii – search/bomb-aiming RADAR

 Pritsel Strelkovyy Periskopicheskiy – flexible periscopic sight

 Pritsel Torpednyy Nizko-vysotnyy – low altitude torpedo sight

 - video recording system

 Pritsel'no-Vychislitel'noye Oostroystvo – computing sight

 - radio transmitter

 Rahdiolokatsionnyy Bombardirovochnyy Pritsel – RADAR bomb sight

 RahdioGhidroakoosticheskiy Booy – sonobuoy

 Rechevoy Informahtor – automatic voice annunciator

 Rahdio'iskhatel Samolyotov – radio device for detecting aircraft early name for RADAR in USSR

 Reghistreeruyushcheye Indikahtornoye oostroystvo – display and recording unit

 RahdioLokatsionnyy Pritsel'nyy Kompleks – radar targeting system

 Radiolokahtor Obzora Zemlee - weather/navigation radar

 Rahdiolokatsionnyy Pritsel – radio[RADAR] sight

 Rahdiolokatsionnyy Pritsel - SA – radio[RADAR] sight

– translusency recorder

 RahdioPoluKompas - direction finder

 RahdioPoluKOmpas - direction finder

 Rahdiolohkatsionnyy Pribor Slepoy Navigahtsii – blind navigation radar device

 Radio Stahntsiya Bombardirovochnaya – bomber aircraft radio station

 Radio Stahntsiya Blizhnei Navigatsii - short range radio navigation system SHORAN

 Radio Stahntsiya Istrebitelnaya – fighter radio system

 Radio Stahntsiya Istrebitelnaya Ultrakorotkovolnovaya – fighter V/UHF radio system

 - data-link system

 Radio Stahntsiya Ultrakorotkovolnovaya – UHF radio system

 RahdiotelemeTricheskaya Stahntsiya – radio telemetry station

 Reshayushcheye Oostroystvo Posahdki – landing computer ILS

 RahdioUstroystvo Slepoy Posahdki – blind landing radio device ILS

 RahdioVysotomer – radio altimeter

 RahdioVysotomer UM – radio altimeter UM

 Sistema Avtomaticheskoy Balansirovki – automatic longitudinal trim system

 - airborne automatic weather research module

 Sistema Avtomaticheskoy Registratsii Poletnykh Parametrov/Parametrov Polyota – in-flight recorder

 Sistema Avtomaticheskogo Upravleniya - autopilot

 - phased array, pulse-doppler radar

 - Svoy/Choozkoy - IFF IFF

 - distance measuring equipment

 Sistema Distancionnogo Upravleniya – fly by wire control system

 Samolyotnoye Gromkogovoryashcheye Oostroystvo – airborne loudspeaker system

 Sheeroko'ugol'nyy Kollimahtornyy Aviatsionnyy Indikahtor – wide angle collimated display for aircraft wide angle HUD

 Samolyotnyy Infrakrahsnyy Vizeer – aircraft mounted Infra-Red sight

 Sistema Navigahtsii - navigation system

 Samoletny Otvetchik – aircraft transponder

 Stahntsiya Opredeleniya Dahl'nosti - radio rangefinder DME

 Sistema otobrazheniya Informahtsii – data presentation system

 Samolyotnyy Otvetchik Mezhdunarodnyy – aircraft mounted international transponder

 Sistema Organicheniya Oogla Atahki – angle of attack limiter system

 Sistema Organichitel'nykh Signahlov – AOA limiter

 [sistema / apparatoora] Slepoy Posahdki - ILS

 Samolotnoye Preeyomnoye Avtomaticheskoye RahdioUstroystvo – airborne automatic radio receiver device [sono-buoy receiver]

 Samolyotnaya peregovornaya Gromkogovoryashchaya Sistema – intercom system

 - LORAN

 Sistema Preduprezhdeniya ob Obluchenii – irradiation warning system[RWR]

 - heading radar

 Stahntsiya Pomekhovykh Signahlov – [lit. interference emitter] active jammer

 Samolyotnoye Peregovornoye Oostroystvo - intercom

 Samolyotnyy RahdioDahl'nomer – aircraft radio rangefinder[gun ranging radar]

 Samolyotnyy Rahdiolokatsionnyy Otvetchik – airborne IFF  transponder

 Shchotno-reshayushchiy Pribor – counting and computing device

 Stahntsiya Razvedki Svyazi – signals intelligence pack

 Sistema/Samolyotnyy Radio[lokatsionnyy] Zaproschik Otvetchik – IFF airborne / system

 Sistema Signalizahtsii Pozhara – fire warning system

 - approach/landing system

 - fuel metering system

 Sistema Oostoychivosti I Oopravlyayemosti - stability and control system

 Sistema Oopravleniya Vo'oruzheniyem – weapons control system

 - medium wave radio

 Sistema Vozdushnyh Signahlov – air data computer

 Sistema Yedinovo Vremeni – time synchronisation system

 Televizionnyy Aviatsionnyy Razvedyvatel'nyy Kompleks – TV reconnaissance system

 TeleKodovaya Sistema – encrypted data-link system

1. TeploPelengahtor – FLIR sensor
2. Televizionnyy Pritsel - television sight

 Tablo Signalizahtsii – warning/caution light panel

 Televizionnyy Strelkovyy Ptritsel - television sighting system

 - Gyro-flux gate

 - fire control RADAR

 Tsifrovoy Pilatzhno-Navigatsionnyy Kompleks – digital flight avionics/navigation suite

 - central air data system

 Tsifrovaya Vychislitel'naya Mashina – digital computer

 Rahdio-Ghidroakoosticheskiy Booy N - sonobuoy

 - combined ASI/machmeter

 - combined ASI/machmeter

1. - nozzle position indicator
2. Ookazahtel' Povorota – turn indicator

 Ookazahtel Polozheniya Stabilizahtora – tailplane incidence indicator

1. - radio receiver
2. Ookazahtel' skorosti - combined airspeed indicator

 Ukazatel Uglov Ataki i Peregruzki – combined AOA and g indicator indicator

 Ookazaht' Oogla Tangazha – pitch angle indicator

 Ookazahtel' Vysoty i Perepahda Davleniya – cockpit altitude and pressure indicator

 Variometr - vertical speed indicator / variometer

 Vychslitel' Ballisticheskiy – ballistics computer

 - altimeter

 - two-needle altimeter

 - sonobuoy system

 - correction switch

 Vychislitel' Kriticheskikh rezheemov - dangerous flight modes computer

 Vremennoy Mekhanizm Shtoormovika – attack release timing mechanism

 - speed altitude auto-hold module

 - altimeter

 - altimeter

References

Gordon, Yefim. Early Soviet Jet Bombers. Hinkley, Midland. 2004. 
Gordon, Yefim. Early Soviet Jet Fighters. Hinkley, Midland. 2002. 
Gordon, Yefim. Sukhoi Interceptors. Hinkley, Midland. 2004. 
Gordon, Yefim. Soviet Rocket Fighters. Hinkley, Midland. 2006.  / 
Gordon, Yefim. Soviet Heavy Interceptors. Hinkley, Midland. 2004. 
Gordon, Yefim. Lavochkin's Last Jets. Hinkley, Midland. 2004.  / 
Gordon, Yefim & Komissarov, Dmitry & Komissarov, Sergey. OKB Ilyushin. Hinkley, Midland. 2004. 
Gunston, Bill. The Osprey Encyclopaedia of Russian Aircraft 1875–1995. London, Osprey. 1995. 
Antonov, Vladimir & Gordon, Yefim & others. OKB Sukhoi. Leicester. Midland. 1996. 
Gordon, Yefim. Komissarov, Dmitry & Sergey. OKB Yakovlev. Hinkley. Midland. 2005. 
Gordon, Yefim & Komissarov, Dmitry. OKB Mikoyan. Hinkley, Midland. 2009. 
Gordon, Yefim. Komissarov, Dmitry & Sergey. OKB Ilyushin. Hinkley. Midland. 2004. 
Gordon, Yefim & Rigmant, Vladimir. Tupolev Tu-144. Midland. Hinkley. 2005.  
Gordon, Yefim & Komissarov, Dmitry. Antonov An-12. Midland. Hinkley. 2007.  
Gordon, Yefim & Komissarov, Dmitry & Komissarov, Sergey. Mil's Heavylift Helicopters. Hinkley, Midland. 2005. 
Gordon, Yefim. Tupolev Tu-160 "Blackjack". Hinkley, Midland. 2003. 
Gordon, Yefim & Komissarov, Dmitry. Antonov's Jet Twins. Hinkley, Midland. 2005. 
Gordon, Yefim & Komissarov, Dmitry. Kamov Ka-27/-32 Family. Hinkley, Midland. 2006.  
Gordon, Yefim & Komissarov, Dmitry. Antonov An-2. Midland. Hinkley. 2004. 
Gordon, Yefim & Rigmant, Vladimir. Tupolev Tu-114. Midland. Hinkley. 2007.  
Gordon, Yefim & Komissarov, Dmitry. Ilyushin Il-12 and Il-14. Midland. Hinkley. 2005.  
Gordon, Yefim. Yakovlev Yak-36, Yak-38 & Yak-41. Midland. Hinkley. 2008. 
Gordon, Yefim. Komissarov, Dmitry & Sergey. Antonov's Turboprop Twins. Hinkley. Midland. 2003. 
Gordon, Yefim. Myasischev M-4 and 3M. Hinkley. Midland. 2003. 
Gordon, Yefim & Rigmant, Vladimir. Tupolev Tu-104. Midland. Hinkley. 2007. 
Gordon, Yefim. Komissarov, Dmitry. Mil Mi-8/Mi-17. Hinkley. Midland. 2003. 
Gordon, Yefim & Dexter, Kieth Polikarpov's I-16 Fighter. Hinkley. Midland. 2001. 
Gordon, Yefim. Mikoyan MiG-25 "Foxbat". Hinkley. Midland. 2007.  
Gordon, Yefim & Dexter, Kieth Mikoyan's Piston-Engined Fighters. Hinkley. Midland. 2003. 
Gordon, Yefim & Rigmant, Vladimir. Tupolev Tu-4. Midland. Hinkley. 2002. 
Gordon, Yefim. Sukhoi S-37 and Mikoyan MFI. Midland. Hinkley. 2001 reprinted 2006.  
Gordon, Yefim. Khazanov, Dmitry. Yakovlev's Piston-Engined Fighters. Hinkley. Midland. 2002. 
Gordon, Yefim. Sal'nikov, Andrey. Zablotsky, Aleksandr. Beriev's Jet Flying Boats. Hinkley. Midland. 2006.  
Gordon, Yefim. & Dexter, Keith. Polikarpov's Biplane Fighters. Hinkley. Midland Publishing. 2002. 
Gordon, Yefim. Soviet/Russian Aircraft Weapons. Midland. 2004. 

Glossaries of Russian and USSR aviation
Avionics
Wikipedia glossaries using description lists